George Dwight Franklin (1888 – 1971) was an American artist, taxidermist, naturalist, museum curator, and costume designer for early Hollywood films.

Personal life 
Dwight Franklin was born on January 28, 1888, in New York City. He married Mary C. McCall Jr., novelist and screenwriter, in January 1928. They divorced in February 1943 and he married Eliza Moultrie Franklin in 1947. The two remained married until his death.

Sometime between 1920 and 1925, Dwight Franklin joined nearly 250 bohemians in signing The Greenwich Village Bookshop Door at Frank Shay's Bookshop on Christopher Street. The door is now held at the Harry Ransom Center at the University of Texas at Austin, and Franklin's signature can be found on front panel 3.

Franklin died on January 19, 1971, in Santa Monica, California.

Career
Dwight Franklin began working in 1906 as a taxidermist for the American Museum of Natural History. In 1910, he participated in a museum-sponsored expedition to Mississippi's Moon Lake: part of the habitat of the American paddlefish. Franklin created many figurines and sculptures. He built historical dioramas for the American Museum of Natural History, the Brooklyn Children's Museum, The Newark Museum of Art, and the Museum of the City of New York.

In 1915, Franklin founded the American Society of Ichthyologists and Herpetologists with John Treadwell Nichols and Henry Weed Fowler.

In the early 1930s, Franklin moved from New York City to Los Angeles to begin work as a costume designer for Hollywood films.

Selected publications

Complete filmography

References

1888 births
1971 deaths
American naturalists
American set designers
American costume designers
Artists from New York City
20th-century naturalists